The Asian Championships in Athletics is a quadrennial event which began in 1973. Asian Athletics Association accepts only athletes who are representing one of the organisation's Asian member states and the body recognises records set at editions of the Asian Athletics Championships.

Men's records

Women's records

References
General
Asian Championships Records. Asian Athletics Association (2009-08-20). Retrieved on 2013-12-28.
Specific

External links
Asian Athletics Association website

Asian Championships
Records
Asian Championships